Johann Stephan Capieux (January 8, 1748 in Schwedt – June 8, 1813 in Leipzig) was a German illustrator of Huguenot origin.

He received his artistic training at the Leipzig Art Academy under Adam Friedrich Oeser. 
Capieux provided illustrations for 
Der Naturforscher 
Johann Samuel Schröter Abhandlungen über verschiedene Gegenstände der Naturgeschichte. Halle 1776 doi:10.5962/bhl.title.36902
Peter Artedi and Johann Gottlob Schneider, 1750-1822 Synonymia piscium Graeca et Latina emendata, aucta atque illustrata. Leipzig 1789 doi:10.5962/bhl.title.5790
Christian Konrad Sprengel Das entdeckte Geheimniss der Natur im Bau und in der Befruchtung der Blumen. Berlin 1793 doi:10.5962/bhl.title.61000
Carl von Linné revised and expanded by Anders Jahan Retzius Faunae suecicae a Carolo à Linné equ. inchoatae pars prima. Leipzig, Siegfried Lebrecht Crusius 1800-1809 doi:10.5962/bhl.title.43961
Johann Matthäus Bechstein, Gemeinnützige Naturgeschichte Deutschlands nach allen drey Reichen ein Handbuch zur deutlichern und vollständigern Selbstbelehrung besonders für Forstmänner, Jugendlehrer und Oekonomen . Leipzig 1801–1809 doi:10.5962/bhl.title.43818
August Johann Georg Karl Batsch Elenchus fungorum. Halae Magdeburgicae : Apud Joannem Jacobum Gebauer [1783-1789]
 Johann Christian von Loder Tabulae anatomicae quas ad :	Vimariae  Sumtibus novi Bibliopolii Vulgo Industrie-Comptoir dicti, 1803.
Abraham Gottlob Werner Handbuch Mineral (1803) 
 Alexander von Humboldt  Flora Fribergensis (1793) online at BHL
 Christian Friedrich Ludwig Icones cavitatum thoracis (1789) 
Paulus Christian Fredrich Werner  1782. Vermium intestinalium brevis exposition continuatio. 28 pp. Lipsiae. 
Karl Ludwig Willdenow Grundriss Der Krauterkunde Berlin, 1810  
Caroli Godofredi Hagen Tentamen historiae lichenum et praesertim prussicorum
Ignaz von Born and  Friedrich Wilhelm Heinrich von Trebra  Bergbaukunde Georg Joachim Göschen (1789–90) 
Georg Franz Hoffmann Descriptio Et Adumbratio Plantarum E Classe Cryptogamica Linnaei quae Lichenes dicuntur Lipsiae Crusius 1794
Johann Ernst Fabri Neues geographisches Lesebuch, zum Nutzen und Vergnügen. Erstes Bändchen (= alles Erschienene). Leipzig: August Leberecht Reinicke, 1791

Gallery

References

External links

 Database of Scientific Illustrators Stuttgart
 University of Halle 

Natural history illustrators
1748 births
1813 deaths
German illustrators